Knockdhu distillery is a whisky distillery in Knock, Banffshire owned by Inver House Distillers Limited.

The distillery was founded in 1893 by John Morrison, who bought the land from the Duke of Fife to produce whisky for Haig's after several springs on the southern slope of Knock Hill were discovered. The site was also chosen for its proximity to the Knock Station on the Banff branch line of the Great North of Scotland Railway (GNSR) between Aberdeen and Elgin. Not only was the new location convenient to the railway but it was also within a few miles of a district noted both for its barley and inexhaustible source of excellent peat. The distillery was built using local eye grey granite, with two coal fired stills, now steam heated. The two pot stills could turn out 2,500 gallons of spirit per week. It was also the first malt distillery built for the Distillers Company Ltd. It started production in 1894 and remained in continuous operation until 1931, when it was forced to close for a few years due to the economic depression. Wartime restrictions on barley forced a second closure from 1940-1945.

After the war, with the distillery connected to the national grid, the steam powered engine, which had been used since its founding, was retired in 1947.

Knockdhu was closed in 1983, and was sold to Inver House in 1988, after which production resumed in February 1989. Various bottling ages are available the most popular being 12 years old, there is also an annual vintage bottled around 14–15 years old, a 16-year-old (matured solely in second fill bourbon casks) and a 30-year-old. Previously named Knockdhu after the distillery, the whisky was renamed anCnoc in 1994 to avoid confusion with Knockando.

Knockdhu Highland Single Malt Scotch Whisky is currently bottled under the Gaelic name anCnoc meaning "the hill".

Awards
anCnoc Highland Single Malt Whisky from Knockdhu Distillery is a multi-award-winning whisky. Recent awards include:

World Whiskies Awards 2019
anCnoc Peatheart – Gold

International Spirits Challenge 2018
anCnoc Rudhan Travel Retail Exclusive – Silver
anCnoc Peatheart – Silver

International Wine & Spirits Challenge 2018
anCnoc 18 Years Old – Gold
anCnoc 24 Years Old – Silver Outstanding
anCnoc 12 Years Old – Silver

World Whisky Awards 2018
anCnoc 2002 – Category Winner
anCnoc Peatheart – Bronze

International Wine and Spirit Competition 2017
anCnoc 12 Years Old – Gold
anCnoc 18 Years Old – Silver
anCnoc 24 Years Old – Silver Outstanding

International Spirits Challenge 2017 
anCnoc 12 Years Old – Gold
anCnoc 18 Years Old – Silver
anCnoc 24 Years Old – Silver

Ultimate Spirits Challenge 2017 
anCnoc 12 Years Old – 96 points, finalist, Great Value
anCnoc 18 Years Old – 94 points, finalist
anCnoc Cutter – 94 points, finalist

New York International Spirits Challenge 2017
anCnoc 12 Years Old – Gold

San Francisco World Spirits Competition 2017
anCnoc 12 Years Old – Double Gold

IWSC 2016 
anCnoc 12 Years Old – Gold
anCnoc 18 Years Old – Silver
anCnoc 24 Years Old – Silver Outstanding
anCnoc Rascan – Silver
anCnoc Barrow – Silver
anCnoc Black Hill Reserve – Silver

International Spirits Challenge 2016 
anCnoc 12 Years Old – Gold
anCnoc 18 Years Old – Silver
anCnoc 24 Years Old – Silver
anCnoc Rascan – Silver
anCnoc Barrow – Silver
anCnoc Black Hill Reserve – Silver

Ultimate Spirits Challenge 2016 
anCnoc 12 Years Old – 87 points
anCnoc Rascan – 95 points

World Whiskies Awards 2016 
anCnoc 18 Years Old – Gold (Category winner)

San Francisco World Spirits Competition 2016 
anCnoc 12 Years Old – Gold
anCnoc Rascan – Double Gold

New York World Spirits Competition 2016 
anCnoc 12 Years Old – Silver

BTI 2016
anCnoc 12 Years Old – Gold

See also
 List of distilleries in Scotland
 List of whisky brands
 Knock railway station

References

External links

 anCnoc Single Malt Whisky - Website
 Inver House Distillers Limited - Corporate Website

Distilleries in Scotland
1893 establishments in Scotland
Scottish malt whisky
Food and drink companies established in 1893
Organisations based in Moray